is a 12-episode Japanese anime television series produced by Eight Bit and directed by Yasuhito Kikuchi. It aired between October 4 and December 20, 2015. The anime has been licensed in North America by Sentai Filmworks.

Plot
Gift is a world where glittering blue crystals known as Giftium are buried deep underground. A young boy named Sōgo Amagi lives in the prosperous mining town of Garden Indigo. Sōgo, whose hobby is collecting rare crystals, one day becomes involved in a dispute between classmates Kaon, Roman, and Otto. He wanders deep into the ruins of a mine and discovers an underground lake. There, Sōgo meets a mysterious blue-haired girl with red eyes named Felia and their fateful meeting is the start of a new adventure with their newly formed bond.

Characters

The main protagonist.  He is an ecstatic boy who likes to collect rare crystals for his hobby, a fascination he inherited from his mother Ena. He wants to prove one of his mother's theories about the existence of a certain red gem called Lucifer. He has a tendency to act recklessly. After finding Felia in a cave, he goes on several adventures with her and his friends Kaon, Roman, and Otto. He falls in love with Felia and both confess their feelings to each other in the final episode, before  Felia leaves behind a pink gem as a memory for him. Later, he becomes a professor and continues his ambition of stone searching while a pink star lighting up in the sky, always shines above him, marking the presence of Felia.

The main heroine. She is a mysterious red-eyed, blue-haired girl Sogo found in a cave. She has powers of telekinesis. It is later revealed that she is the embodiment of the planet. She eventually falls in love with Sogo. Both Felia and Sogo confess their feelings to each other in the final episode, where she sacrifices her life to save the planet and Sogo and leaves behind a pink gem as memory for Sogo promising him that she will always be with. Later a pink star lighting up in the sky, always shines above Sogo, marking the presence of Felia.

One of Sogo's friends at school. She is Roman's former fiancée through an arranged marriage. She has a crush on Sogo. She later marries Roman and they are shown having kids in the ending credits of the series.

Another one of Sogo's friends at school. He is Kaon's fiancé through an arranged marriage but breaks the engagement in episode 10, he also owns a mecha. Later, he marries Kaon and both are shown having kids in the ending credits of the series.

Roman's butler.

A crystal snake that serves Sogo and Felia. Called Moura for short, she can transform into a mecha when she senses danger. She is there mainly to keep Felia's powers in check.

Owner of a café and Sogo's caretaker. He was previously a researcher who worked closely with Sogo's mother Ena, but he left the profession after Ena was killed over the red crystal that possesses an enormous amount of energy. Since then, he had been running a café and raising Sogo. In episode 9, he died due to being run through by a sword.

Broadcast and distribution
The Comet Lucifer anime television series is produced by Eight Bit and is directed by Yasuhito Kikuchi, with Atsushi Nakayama serving as the series director. The series aired in Japan between October 4 and December 20, 2015 on Tokyo MX. The screenplay is written by Yūichi Nomura, who originally conceived the series. Chief animator Yūichi Takahashi is also the character designer. Takayuki Yanase is the mechanical designer. Sound and music direction is headed by Jin Aketagawa, and the music is composed by Tatsuya Kato. The anime has been licensed in North America by Sentai Filmworks, and was simulcast by Crunchyroll. A series of flash anime shorts titled  will be released on the Blu-ray compilation volumes starting on January 29, 2016.

Episode list

References

External links
 

2015 anime television series debuts
Eight Bit (studio)
Anime with original screenplays
Bandai Visual
Mecha anime and manga
Medialink
Sentai Filmworks
Tokyo MX original programming